At the 2000 Summer Olympics, women's trap shooting was included for the first time. The competition was held on 18 September, with Daina Gudzinevičiūtė becoming the inaugural champion.

Records
Prior to this competition, the existing World and Olympic records were as follows.

Qualification round

OR Olympic record – Q Qualified for final

Final

OR Olympic record

References

Sources

Shooting at the 2000 Summer Olympics
Olymp
Women's events at the 2000 Summer Olympics